Laxta friedmani, the flat cockroach,  is a species of Blaberidae occurring in Australia. The habitat is under loose back of eucalyptus trees, and fallen leaf litter on the ground. Length is up to 25 mm, a flattened creature, resembling a trilobite, sometimes found in small groups. Females are wingless, adult males with wings.

References

Blaberidae
Insects of Australia
Insects described in 1992